Nicholas Rawlins (born 1949) is a British experimental psychologist, and one of the pro-vice-chancellor and vice-president of The Chinese University of Hong Kong.

Life
Born in 1949, he is the only son of Sir John Rawlins and the grandson of Stuart Rawlins. He was educated at Westbury House School and Winchester College before reading for a BA in Psychology, Physiology and Philosophy at University College, Oxford. He was awarded first class honours in 1971. He subsequently studied for a D.Phil at Oxford under the supervision of Jeffrey Gray. He was married to the philosopher Susan Hurley from 1986 until her death on 16 August 2007.

Rawlins is Pro-Vice-Chancellor and Professor of Behavioural Neuroscience at the University of Oxford. His research interests include animal learning and memory, brain mechanisms of memory storage, animal models of psychosis, attentional deficits in schizophrenia, functional magnetic resonance imaging studies of pain in humans, and behavioural phenotyping of genetically modified mice.

Rawlins was a Fellow of University College, Oxford, from 1983 until the end of 2007, when he moved to a Professorial Fellowship at Wolfson College, Oxford. He retains his link with University College as an Emeritus Fellow. He was appointed as Oxford University's Pro-Vice-Chancellor for Development and External Affairs on 23 June 2010.

In 2018, Rawlins became Master of Morningside College of the Chinese University of Hong Kong. In August 2021, he was appointed as one of the Pro-Vice-Chancellors of the University.

Works
His most cited paper is entitled "Place navigation impaired in rats with hippocampal lesions", published in Nature in 1982 jointly with Richard G. Morris, Paul Garrud, and John O'Keefe, which  had been cited 3,691 times by January 2015 according to the Web of Science.

References

1949 births
Living people
British psychologists
Alumni of University College, Oxford
Fellows of University College, Oxford
Fellows of Wolfson College, Oxford
English psychologists
Pro-Vice-Chancellors of the University of Oxford